José Carbone (15 September 1930 – 7 June 2014) was an Argentine footballer. He played in one match for the Argentina national football team in 1959. He was also part of Argentina's squad for the 1959 South American Championship that took place in Ecuador.

References

External links
 
 

1930 births
2014 deaths
Argentine footballers
Argentina international footballers
Place of birth missing
Association football midfielders
Ferro Carril Oeste footballers
Argentinos Juniors footballers
Club Atlético Independiente footballers
Club Atlético River Plate footballers
Club Atlético Huracán footballers
Rosario Central footballers
Club Atlético Platense footballers